Oenone Wood (born 24 September 1980 in Newcastle, New South Wales, Australia) is a retired professional cyclist, who commenced her cycling career in 2001 at the age of 21. She was an Australian Institute of Sport scholarship holder.

She was a member of professional cycling Team Columbia Women (USA) and the Canberra Cycling Club, and formerly of the T-Mobile Professional Women's Cycling Team (GER) and Equipe Nürnberger Versicherung. She lives in Merewether, a suburb of Newcastle.

Oenone achieved success as a road cyclist in Australia, including the Bay Criterium Series, and the Geelong Tour.

She had great success overseas, particularly winning stages of the Giro d'Italia Femminile (ITA) and the Points Classification for the Giro d'Italia Femminile in 2004 and 2005, as well winning the UCI Women's Road World Cup series in 2004 and 2005. In the 2004 Summer Olympics Women's Road race she was in the leading group with fellow Australian Sara Carrigan, and when Carrigan and Judith Arndt broke away in the final lap to win the gold and silver medals, Wood had to sprint for the bronze medal with Olga Slyusareva of Russia and Nicole Cooke of Great Britain, coming 4th overall in the race.

She won the Women's Time Trial at the 2006 Commonwealth Games in Melbourne, also winning the silver medal in the Women's Road Race, behind fellow Australian Natalie Bates.

She was the 2004 and 2008 Australian Open Road champion (in the Elite Women's Road Race event).

In 2016, she was inducted into Cycling Australia Hall of Fame.

Career highlights

2003
 UCI Points list – 18th place
 1st, Grand Prix Cavrie (Ita)
 3rd, Fleche Wallonne (World Cup)
 6th, Primavera Rosa (World Cup)
 3rd overall and 1 stage win, Trophee d'Or (cat. 2)
 4th overall, Giro della Toscana (cat. 1)
 7th overall, Castilla y Leon Tour (cat. 1)
2004
 1st  Overall UCI Women's Road World Cup
 1st 2004 Road World Cup Rankings
 1st Criterium Series Tour Down Under AUS
 1st  Australian Open Road Race Title VIC
 1st  Australian Open Road Time Trial Title VIC
 1st Road World Cup Geelong AUS
 1st Stage 1 Giro d'Italia Femminile ITA
 1st Points Classification Giro d'Italia Femminile ITA
 1st Overall Geelong Tour AUS
 1st Stage 2 Geelong Tour AUS
 1st Giro Frazioni ITA
 1st Trofeo Citta di Rosignano ITA
 1st Trofeo Museo Alfredo Binda ITA
 1st Souvenir Magali Pache SUI
2005
 1st  Overall UCI Women's Road World Cup
 1st, Le Tour du Grand Montréal
 1st, Points classification and Stages 1, 3a and 6, Tour de l'Aude Cycliste Féminin FRA
 1st,  Australian Open Road Time Trial Titles SA
 1st,  Australian Criterium Title VIC
 1st, Bay Series Criteriums VIC
 1st, Round 2
 1st, Round 3
 1st, Overall Geelong Tour AUS
 1st, Sprint Classification
 1st, Stage 2
 1st, Stage 4
2006 (Equipe Nürnberger Versicherung)
2007
 1st, Overall, Tour du Grand Montréal CAN (2.1W)
 1st, Points classification
 1st, Sprint classification
 1st, Stage 4
 1st, Stage 5
2008
 1st Australian Open Road Race Titles VIC

References

External links

 Australian Cycling Federation Profile
 Commonwealth Games
 
 
 
 

1980 births
Living people
Australian female cyclists
Cyclists at the 2004 Summer Olympics
Cyclists at the 2008 Summer Olympics
Cyclists at the 2006 Commonwealth Games
Olympic cyclists of Australia
Commonwealth Games silver medallists for Australia
Sportswomen from New South Wales
Sportspeople from Newcastle, New South Wales
Australian Institute of Sport cyclists
Commonwealth Games medallists in cycling
ACT Academy of Sport alumni
Medallists at the 2006 Commonwealth Games